This is a list of students' associations in Quebec, Canada.

Federations
 Fédération étudiante collégiale du Québec (FECQ)  
 Union étudiante du Québec (UEQ)

Universities

CEGEPs
 Association générale étudiante de Bois-de-Boulogne (AGEBdeB)
Société générale des étudiantes et étudiants du Collège de Maisonneuve (SOGEECOM)
Dawson Student Union (Syndicat des étudiantes et étudiants du Collège Dawson)
Vanier College Students' Association (Association des Étudiantes et Étudiants du College Vanier; VCSA)

See also
List of Canadian students' associations

Quebec
Students' associations
Students' associations
Students' associations
Canada education-related lists